The governor of Sorsogon is the local chief executive of the province of Sorsogon, Philippines. Like all local government heads in the Philippines, the governor is elected via popular vote, and may not be elected for a fourth consecutive term (although the former governor may return to office after an interval of one term). In case of death, resignation or incapacity, the vice governor becomes the governor.

List of governors

References

Governors of provinces of the Philippines
Politics of Sorsogon